The International Federation of Little Brothers of the Poor ( or ) is a federation of volunteer-based non-profit organizations committed to relieving isolation and loneliness among the elderly. They aim to create links between elderly people who need to make friends for example clubs or classes. Even during lockdowns they want to help those in need maintain contact.

It was founded 1979 in Rolle, Switzerland and has been recognized as a NGO (non-governmental organization) in consultative status (category II) with the United Nations Economic and Social Council.

In 2008, volunteers held a benefit concert in Toulouse, France, to raise money for the organization.

Members 

Its member countries / organizations are:

 Canada: les petits frères des Pauvres
 France: les petits frères des Pauvres
 Germany: Freunde alter Menschen e. V.
 Ireland: The Little Brothers (Friends of the Elderly) Limited.
 Mexico: Los Hermanos del Anciano A.C.
 Poland: Mali bracia Ubogich
 Spain: Amigos de los mayores / Amics de la Gent Gran
 Switzerland: La Fondation les petits frères des Pauvres
 United States: Little Brothers - Friends of the Elderly

See also
La Brindille D'Or

References

External links 
 http://www.petitsfreres.org Website of the International Federation of Little Brothers of the Poor
 http://www.petitsfreresdespauvres.fr Website of French mother organization: les petits frères des Pauvres
 https://www.usatoday.com/news/nation/2006-08-05-lonely-americans_x.htm USA TODAY Article: Isolated Americans trying to connect

Charities for the elderly
Organizations based in Quebec
Charities based in Canada